Pacobo (also spelled Pakobo) is a town in southeastern Ivory Coast. It is a sub-prefecture of Taabo Department in Agnéby-Tiassa Region, Lagunes District.

Pacobo was a commune until March 2012, when it became one of 1126 communes nationwide that were abolished.

In 2014, the population of the sub-prefecture of Pacobo was 14,510.

Villages
The 6 villages of the sub-prefecture of Pacobo and their population in 2014 are:
 Adikouassikro (1 186)
 Ahérémou 1 (874)
 Ahouakro (4 151)
 N'da-Gnamien (3 790)
 Pacobo (1 710)
 Singrobo (2 799)

References

Sub-prefectures of Agnéby-Tiassa
Former communes of Ivory Coast